Bill Everitt may refer to:

Bill Everitt (baseball) (1868–1938), Major League Baseball player
Bill Everitt (racing driver) (1901–1993), MG race car driver